KELO (1320 kHz, "Newstalk 1320 KELO") is an AM radio station licensed to Sioux Falls, South Dakota, airing a news/talk format. It is owned by Midwest Communications, Inc.

History
Originally issued a construction permit under the call sign KGSS in 1936, KELO signed on September 5, 1937, on 1200 kHz, under the ownership of the Sioux Falls Broadcasting Association, also the owner of KSOO. Both stations were affiliates of the NBC radio networks. It moved to 1230 kHz in 1941 as a result of the NARBA agreement. KELO was sold to the Midcontinent Broadcasting Company on September 19, 1946. It moved to its current frequency May 2, 1948, and concurrently increased its power from 250 watts to 5 kW. The broadcaster, which later became Midcontinent Media, sold off its radio properties, including KELO, to Backyard Broadcasting in 2004. The Backyard Broadcasting group would be sold to its current owner, Midwest Communications, in 2012.

KELO was a Top 40 station from approximately the 1960s through the 1980s, and then became an oldies/classic hits hybrid by the 1990s.  The station flipped to its current talk format in July 2000.

KELO-TV was co-owned with KELO radio from 1953 until 1995, when Midcontinent sold the TV station to Young Broadcasting. (Nexstar Media Group is the current owner of KELO-TV today.)

References

External links
FCC History Cards for KELO

ELO
News and talk radio stations in the United States
Radio stations established in 1937
1937 establishments in South Dakota
Midwest Communications radio stations